Yisrael or Israel Katz may refer to:

 Yisrael Katz (born 1927), Israeli politician, former Minister of Labour and Social Welfare
 Israel Katz (born 1955), Israeli politician, MK for Likud and Minister of Foreign Affairs, Minister of Transportation and Minister of Intelligence and Atomic Energy